Igbo rap is a Nigerian style of hip hop music that originated in the Igbo-dominated southeastern region of Nigeria and has become more popular since 2000. The style draws its main influences from Igbo traditional music and African American music. Aside other derived styles, it can be combined with highlife, R&B and afro-soul. Most artists and groups who perform Igbo rap usually deliver their lyrics in the Igbo language, although on some occasions, Igbo is blended with Pidgin English.

Early pioneers in the scene include Mr Raw (formerly Dat N.I.G.G.A. Raw), Massai, Slowdog, MC Loph, Big Lo and 2Shotz. Today, many musical acts like Phyno, Ugoccie, BosaLin, Nuno Zigi, Zoro, Ifex G, Hype MC (who is the younger brother of Mr Raw), K-Large (who is considered the fastest Igbo rapper) Chimason and Tidinz are considered Igbo rap artists.

See also

Igbo language
Igbo culture

References

Igbo rap
Nigerian hip hop
Nigerian styles of music
Hip hop genres
African hip hop
2000s in music
21st-century music genres